Toy Soldiers is a 1984 action film, co-production between The United States and Mexico, written and directed by David Andrew Fisher and starring Jason Miller, Cleavon Little, Tim Robbins and Terri Garber.

Premise
A group of Caltech students yachting off the coast of Central America are held hostage by terrorists. A retired U.S. Marine trains the hostages' friends to become an impromptu special ops force.

Cast
 Jason Miller as Sarge
 Cleavon Little as Buck
 Tim Robbins as Boe
 Angélica Aragón as Presidenta López
 Rodolfo de Anda as Col. López
 Terri Garber as Amy
 Tracy Scoggins as Monique
 Douglas Warhit as Larry 
 Willard E. Pugh as Ace (as Willard Pugh)
 Jim Greenleaf as Tom
 Mary Beth Evans as Buffy
 Jay W. Baker as Jeff
 Larry Poindexter as Trevor
 Roger Cudney as Mr. Green

References

External links
 
 

1984 films
1984 action thriller films
American action thriller films
Mexican action films
1980s English-language films
1980s American films
1980s Mexican films